Guillaume Patry is a Canadian professional StarCraft player who plays under the alias Grrrr... He is from Quebec City, was a StarCraft world champion in 1999. He dominated the scene as a random player before he arrived in Korea, where he then focused on the Protoss race. While Garimto pioneered many "cheesy" strategies for Protoss, virtually every (then) standard build order was a direct result of Grrr's innovations. He won the Hanaro OSL- the first OSL in history- a king of king's tournament, and placed high in a variety of others in a long career. Eventually his interest and performance in Starcraft declined, resulting in his retirement in early 2004.

After he retired, he became a gambler with Bertrand Grospellier, former French professional StarCraft gamer, but quit again.

According to a report from FOMOS (online professional game media), he's living a life as an ordinary staff member of a company, but he said that he could return to the professional game field after the release of StarCraft II: Wings of Liberty.

He was a panelist on the talk show Non-Summit and a cast member of the variety-travel show that branched off it, Where Is My Friend's Home in South Korea. In May 2015 it was announced that Patry had signed the management contract  with JTBC.

Tournament results
  1st —  Hanaro OSL

See also
 StarCraft in esports

References

Living people
StarCraft players
Canadian esports players
Canadian expatriates in South Korea
Canadian television personalities
Canadian people of French descent
French Quebecers
Year of birth missing (living people)